Saved by the Light is a 1994 nonfiction book by Dannion Brinkley describing his purported near-death experience (NDE).  It is co-authored by Paul Perry. The book was adapted for a 1995 FOX TV film of the same name starring Eric Roberts.

Content 

Brinkley claims to have been struck by lightning and to have clinically died for approximately twenty-eight minutes. He eventually told of a dark tunnel, a crystal city, and a "cathedral of knowledge" where thirteen "angels" shared with him over a hundred revelations about the future, some of which he claims have come true.

Reception

Commercial success 
Within two weeks of publication, another 5000 copies were printed.  The book was on The New York Times bestseller charts for over 25 weeks and it was distributed in over 20 countries.

Brinkley followed up this book with the sequels, At Peace in the Light in 1995, followed by Secrets of the Light in 2009, and Ten Things to Know Before You Go in 2014.
It was also made into a movie of the same title.

Refutations 
Some of the book's assertions were subsequently challenged, including claims of where and how Brinkley recovered and how long he was supposedly dead, and claims made about his military service record. Interviews with his physician and the reporter who interviewed him indicate that Brinkley never entered the hospital or morgue and that Brinkley originally did not claim to have died, but only that he "was out for a few minutes", and that his wife saved his life.

See also
 Saved by the Light (film)

References 

1994 non-fiction books
1995 non-fiction books
Supernatural books
Books about near-death experiences
Villard (imprint) books